This article shows the participating team squads at the 1990 FIVB Women's World Championship, held from 22 August to 1 September in China.

(1st)
Coach: Nikolay Karpol

(2nd)
Coach: Hu Jin

(3rd)
Coach: Taras Liskevych

(4th)

(5th)
Head coach: Lee chang ho

(6th)

(7th)
Coach: Inaldo Manta

(8th)

(9th)

(10th)

(11th)

(12th)

(13th)

(14th)

(15th)

(16th)

References

S
FIVB Volleyball Women's World Championship squads